The imperial phase is the period in which a musical artist is regarded to be at their commercial and creative peak simultaneously. The phrase was coined by Neil Tennant of the Pet Shop Boys to describe the group's feelings on their career circa "Domino Dancing" (1988).

Usage
"Imperial phase" has been applied by pop music critics and fans to the creative output of artists. While its original usage implied that an imperial phase was a one-time occurrence for a single artist, artists have been referred to as having multiple imperial phases. The term may also be applied to non-musical entities, such as film studios.

Critic Tom Ewing described three criteria for defining an artist's imperial phase: "command, permission, and self-definition". He defined "command" as an artist's ability to push the boundaries of their medium in a way that produces lasting change. "Permission" is the public's goodwill toward and interest in the artist's work. Finally, "self-definition" is the concept that the imperial phase defines the rest of the artist's career; future works will be compared to those from the imperial phase.

See also
Zeitgeist

References

External links
 

Pop music
Music criticism